WKAR-FM is a public radio station in East Lansing, Michigan, United States; broadcasting on the FM dial at 90.5 MHz.  It is owned by Michigan State University, and is sister station to the AM radio and television stations with the same call letters.

The station airs classical music, and several of National Public Radio's more popular programs, such as Morning Edition, Weekend Edition, All Things Considered and Wait Wait... Don't Tell Me. Many of these are simulcast with its AM sister.

In January 2013, WKAR launched the daily news/arts radio magazine Current State, an hour-long program of interviews and produced reports devoted to Mid-Michigan and statewide politics, government, business, education, environment, science, technology, health, medicine and the arts. The program is broadcast Monday through Friday at 9 am and 6 pm on 90.5 FM and weekdays at noon on AM 870. Current State Weekend airs Saturdays and Sundays on both 90.5 FM and AM 870.

The station is also the primary Emergency Alert System (EAS) station for the state of Michigan, relaying emergency messages from the Michigan State Police to all media outlets in Michigan; WKAR-FM hosts statewide tests twice a year. WKAR-FM is also the secondary EAS station for Lansing and the South Central Michigan region (WFMK is the primary station for the region).

The station signed on for the first time on October 4, 1948, as the Lansing area's first FM station. Like most FM stations of the time, it simulcast its AM sister during its sunrise to sunset broadcast hours. When the AM station signed off at sunset to protect WWL in New Orleans, WKAR-FM would then carry its own signature programming which included classical music and other arts-related programs. The two stations split their broadcasting schedules on March 1, 1965, with the FM station airing fine arts programming. The WKAR stations were charter members of NPR in 1971, and were among the 90 stations to carry the inaugural broadcast of All Things Considered.

The station's 85,000-watt signal, combined with a 269.3 meter antenna can be heard as far east as Flint and the Detroit suburbs, and as far west as Grand Rapids and Kalamazoo. WKAR-FM is a "Superpower Grandfathered" Class B FM station, providing a signal 7.6 dB stronger than would be granted today under current U.S. Federal Communications Commission (FCC) rules.

HD programming
WKAR-FM is licensed by the FCC to broadcast in the HD (hybrid) format. Until 2017, its HD signal broadcast on three streams.

HD1 was a simulcast of the analog FM signal's NPR and classical music format.

HD2 was a simulcast of the Classical 24 classical music channel, which airs on the main signal from 7 pm to 5 am.

HD3 was a simulcast of WKAR (870 AM), continuing from local sunset to sunrise when the AM station is not broadcasting. It was also simulcast on a low-powered translator at 105.1 FM giving most of the Lansing area access to a locally focused NPR news and talk station.

As of June 30, 2017, WKAR-FM has discontinued HD Radio services. However, the classical stream remained, and has since been augmented with streams of the Lansing area's radio reading service along with a jazz channel.

Sources

External links

NPR member stations
Michigan State University
Classical music radio stations in the United States
KAR-FM
Radio stations established in 1948
KAR-FM
1948 establishments in Michigan